The Moriah War Memorial College (or more commonly, Moriah College) is an independent  Modern Orthodox Jewish co-educational early learning, primary and secondary day school, located in Queens Park, an eastern suburb of Sydney, New South Wales, Australia. The college provides education from early learning through Kindergarten to Year 12.

The college is a member of the Jewish Communal Appeal, and the Junior School Heads Association of Australia (JSHAA).

History
Founded in 1942 by Abraham Rabinovitch, Moriah College started as a small school located in Glenayr Avenue, which is still in use today as an affiliated kindergarten. Harold Nagley, the first principal of Moriah, travelled door to door in an attempt to recruit pupils. In 1952, Rabinovitch purchased a   property from the estate of the late Mark Foy for A£. Following renovations, the college opened at the Bellevue Hill site in 1953, with 57 students.

Further renovations were completed in the mid-1960s and, by 1967, the King David School in Edgecliff, formed by the New South Wales Jewish Board of Deputies in 1960, merged with Moriah College. The King David School relocated to a property in Dover Road, purchased from another school, and the Bellevue Hill site was used as a high school. From 1975, the college rapidly expanded from 500 to 800 students, and additional properties were acquired in Bellevue Hill to allow for further expansion. Yet college officials had reservations that the site would not accommodate future growth.

Moriah College made an offer for this campus, but the Premier, Neville Wran, rejected the offer, following a public campaign organised by the NSW Teachers' Federation. Wran offered the college a lease over land located in Queens Park, on the site of the old Eastern Suburbs Hospital, and construction of a new high school began. Amid cost overruns and delays, by late 1993 the college decided to relocate the primary school to the site as well, and sell all land held at Bellevue Hill. Over A$12 million was realised from the sale of the college's Bellevue Hill properties.

The college is now entirely situated on the Queens Park campus, having purchased the land from the NSW Government in 2011 for 27 million, with the final instalment of A$20.25 million payable in February 2014. Some older buildings remain from the Eastern Suburbs Hospital that previously occupied part of the site. Additional affiliated preschool campuses are located in Bondi, and Rose Bay.

Augustine "Gus" Nosti, the former financial controller was charged with five counts of dishonestly obtaining a financial advantage by deception. The alleged frauds were conducted over a 15-year period and worth $7 million. The school's treasurer at the time; Stephen Jankelowitz, CEO of AGEIS accounting failed to identify the mass fraud. Despite the embarrassment, Mr Jankelowitz remains president of the school as it continues  its decline in financial and ATR performance. 

In May 2020, during the COVID-19 pandemic a student tested positive to coronavirus causing the school to be shut down as a precaution.

Extracurricular
The school's Symphonic Wind Ensemble won the NSW Junior band championships in May 2012 building on the work of a number of band tours.

In 2015, the Moriah Rugby team did very well. Both the Under 14 and 18 teams came third in the Peninsula Cup Tournament.

The Moriah Football (soccer) First XI won the prestigious NSW Combined Independent Schools Cup for the first time in 2015, beating Barker College in the grand final. The team then went on to retain the title in 2016, becoming the first school to do so, after coming back from 3-1 down to beat Newington College 4–3 in the grand final.

Notable alumni
Cheryl Bart , a lawyer, company director, and expeditioner 
Nikki Bart, an Australian mountain climber and medical doctor with a specialist interest in hypoxia secondary to high altitude
Ryan Blumberg, a former professional footballer who played as a defender for Charlton Athletic in 2017 and accepted a two-year scholarship at the University of Maryland, USA in 2019
Jonathan Daddia, a 2010 MasterChef contestant
 Yuval Freilich, Israeli épée fencer, 2019 European Épée Champion
Professor Michelle Haber , a leading Australian cancer scientist at the Children's Cancer Institute of Australia class of 1973
Max Lemberg, receiver of an OAM and teacher for over 5 decades
Ben Lee, musician
Nick Molnar, co-founder and CEO of Afterpay
Ben Pasternak, co-founder and CEO of SIMULATE
Henry Roth, fashion designer

See also 

 List of non-government schools in New South Wales

References

External links 
Moriah College website

Educational institutions established in 1942
Jewish secondary schools in Sydney
Jewish primary schools in Sydney
Modern Orthodox Jewish day schools
Junior School Heads Association of Australia Member Schools
Jews and Judaism in Sydney
1942 establishments in Australia